Jennifer Kehlet Barton is an American biomedical engineer who is Director of the BIO5 Institute at the University of Arizona. Barton develops optical techniques for the detection and treatment of cancer.

Early life and education 
Barton earned her bachelor's degree in electrical engineering at the University of Texas at Austin. She moved to the University of California, Irvine for her graduate studies. She then joined McDonnell Douglas, an aerospace engineering organisation that later became Boeing. She eventually returned to academia, moving to the University of Texas at Austin to research biomedical engineering for a doctoral degree.

Research and career 
In 1998, Barton joined the faculty of the University of Arizona. She has investigated a variety of imaging techniques for diagnosing and treating cancer, including optical coherence tomography and fluorescence spectroscopy. Barton has developed miniature, integrated endoscopes that combine both imaging modalities, with a particular focus on identifying the biomarkers that underpin ovarian cancer. At the time, screening for ovarian cancer included pelvic ultrasounds and blood tests for CA-125, but neither of these techniques improve the outcomes for people with ovarian cancer.

In 2018 Barton was named the Director of the University of Arizona BIO5 Institute. The institute welcomes scientists from a variety of disciplines, including agriculture and pharmacy.

Awards and honors 
 1997 SPIE D. J. Lovell Scholarship
 2008 Elected Fellow of SPIE
 2009 Elected Fellow of the American Institute for Medical and Biological Engineering
 2011 Elected Da Vinci Fellow of the University of Arizona
 2012 AZBio Michael A. Cusanovich Biosciences Educator of the Year Award
 2016 SPIE President's Award

Selected publications

References 

University of Texas at Austin alumni
University of California, Irvine alumni
University of Arizona faculty
Living people
Year of birth missing (living people)
American women scientists
American biomedical engineers
Fellows of SPIE
Fellows of the American Institute for Medical and Biological Engineering
American women academics
21st-century American women